The MSW Votec 221 is a single engine, single seat kitbuilt light-sport aircraft, designed and built in Switzerland.

Design and development

The Votec 221 is a single seat, low wing monoplane, designed for engines in the power range 90-180 kW (120-240 hp). The first prototype, completed in 2009, has a 157 kW (210 hp) Lycoming AEIO-390 flat-four engine and the second, finished the following year, a 134 kW (180 hp) engine. MSW's numerical designation has two digits indicating power in hp/10, followed by the number of seats, suggesting an optimum 220 hp power unit.

Externally, the Votec 221 resembles a scaled down (span, 80%) MSW Votec 351. It has low aspect ratio straight tapered wings with blunt, almost square tips. Ailerons are assisted by external spades. The empennage is also straight tapered, with a forward set tailplane mounted on top of the fuselage, far enough forward on the fin to require only a small cut-out for movement of the deep rudder. Both elevators have trim tabs and the rudder is horn balanced. The cockpit, placed over the wing, is covered with a single piece, starboard hinged canopy. Like the Votec 351, the 321 has a conventional undercarriage. The mainwheels are mounted on curved, sprung cantilever legs and enclosed by long fairings. It has a steerable tailwheel on a long cantilever.

Operational history
The first prototype is Swiss-registered and the second German, the latter appearing at Aero 2011, held at Friedrichshafen that April. First flight dates were not released by late 2011 but the first prototype was certainly flying by late May 2012. A full scale non-flying mock up has also been exhibited.

Variants
MSW One
Version for the US one design class with a  Lycoming IO-360 engine.

Specifications

References

External links

2000s Swiss sport aircraft
Homebuilt aircraft
Single-engined tractor aircraft
Low-wing aircraft
Votec 221